Icanosaurus is an extinct genus of trematosaurian temnospondyl within the family Trematosauridae.

Bibliography
Rusconi, C. 1951. Laberintodontes triásicos y pérmicos de Mendoza. Revista del Museo de Historia Natural de Mendoza 5:33-158.

See also
 Prehistoric amphibian
 List of prehistoric amphibians

Trematosaurs
Fossil taxa described in 1951